Crystal Peak is a mountain in Sierra County, California.

Crystal Mine
The first recorded visit to the Crystal Peak (on which the mine is located) was in 1845 by a Stevens wagon train. After the town of Crystal was abandoned, the local roads fell into disrepair (later being reconstructed in 1992). 
Access to the Crystal Mine is currently available to the public for non-commercial purposes, though a limit of one 5 gallon bucket of crystals per vehicle per week is in effect.

References

Mountains of Sierra County, California
Mountains of Northern California